Jab Pyaar Kisise Hota Hai is an Indian Hindi-language romance film released in 1998. Directed by Deepak Sareen and written by Honey Irani, the film stars Salman Khan as womaniser Sooraj and Twinkle Khanna as his first real love. Aditya Narayan plays Khan's previously unknown son.

Plot 

This film starts with Sooraj Dhanrajgir, a rich playboy lightening the financial burden of his industrialist grandfather  by spending his riches on alcohol and women. His grandfather calls him for some official work back home, beginning with a hotel project in Ooty. There his true character emerges as he starts running after pretty women. The first one he lays his eyes on is Komal. He convinces her that she is his childhood friend and sweet-talks her into falling for him. But soon she sees him for the player he is and walks out on him.

Sooraj is smitten beyond infatuation and, knowing she runs a boutique in a hotel somewhere in Mumbai, he goes through the hotels of the city until he locates her. He tries his best to win her back but fails.

Sooraj's grandfather steps in to ease the situation and asks her to marry him. Komal agrees, on the condition that he would have to give up his playboy lifestyle and become responsible: He would have to quit smoking, drinking, and women for her to marry him. Sooraj, not quite the man he was, gives up every bad habit he has.

One day Sooraj returns home and he finds a boy, Kabir, claiming to be his son.

Tests prove that Kabir is indeed his son, but Sooraj doesn't even remember the mother. Kabir shows him a photograph which helps Sooraj identify the woman he had a fling lasting a few months. He brings the boy back, identifying him as his friend's child. Sooraj starts to like him and gradually, realizing his mistake, he recognises him as his son. But Kabir does not like Komal and is unhappy to learn that Sooraj never loved his mother.

Later Sooraj has to choose between Komal and Kabir. Sooraj is about to marry Komal, but he knows that he cannot hide the truth from Komal. He falls into a dilemma. His friend Mahesh suggests he should tell the truth to Komal about Kabir before their marriage if he really loves her. He tries several times to speak to Komal, but circumstances do not allow him to convey his message.

On the day of their marriage, he lands at her house with his grandfather, Mahesh, and Kabir. He accepts his mistakes that he made in life and tells Komal and her family that Kabir is his son. On hearing this Komal's family gets angry and demands Sooraj disown Kabir if he wants to marry their daughter. Sooraj refuses to do that and prefers his son over his love.

Komal hails Sooraj's honesty and agrees to accept Kabir as her son and to marry Sooraj.

Cast 
Salman Khan as Sooraj Dhanrajgir
Twinkle Khanna as Komal Sinha Dhanrajgir
Namrata Shirodkar as Pooja Bachchan, Kabir's mother
Johnny Lever as Mahesh
Anupam Kher as Dadaji, Sooraj's grandfather
Mushtaq Khan as Singh
Aditya Narayan as Kabir Dhanrajgir 
Saeed Jaffery as Komal's father
Farida Jalal as Komal's mother
Harish Patel as Komal's Uncle
Vivek Vaswani as Suraj Dhanoa
Himani Shivpuri as Ragini Sinha, Komal's Bua

Production
The film marked the film debut of Namrata Shirodkar.

Box office 
The film did quite well at the box office and was declared a  hit. Salman's work and his chemistry with Aditya Narayan were widely appreciated. It was the eleventh highest-grossing movie of 1998.

Soundtrack 

Jab Pyaar Kisise Hota Hais music was one of the best-selling albums of 1998. Composed by Jatin–Lalit with lyrics by Anand Bakshi, most of the songs were sung by Lata Mangeshkar, Kumar Sanu, Udit Narayan, Sonu Nigam & Alka Yagnik.
"Mysterious Girl" by Peter Andre has been adapted as "is dil mein kya hai,dhadkan" whereas "pehli pehli baar " has been lifted too from an old English disco smashit number "Born to be alive" by Patrick Hernandez.

The producers of film (Taurani Brothers) told the composers that they wanted the music of the movie to be on the top charts even before signing them. And no wonder Jatin–Lalit did the justice with the score.
Mohammad Ali Ikram of Planet Bollywood gave the album 9 stars and stated: "A film which names itself after this immortal tune better have amazing songs. Not to worry, Jatin Lalit deliver a score which is as beautiful as it is melodious, as romantic as it is nostalgic, as simple as it is... In four words, you will love it."

The film's soundtrack album sold  units in India, making it the ninth top-selling Bollywood music album of 1998.

Reception
A review in India Today noted that the story could potentially have been a "four-hankie tearjerker" but Sareen failed "to deliver". It opined that the "typically over-confident Bollywood brat" Aditya Narayan was the film's biggest problem and it was Khan who "[kept] the film going" quite opposite to Khanna's "awkward hysterics". Concluding the review, it called for her "to take both acting and grooming lessons from mom". Writing for Rediff.com, Dhara Kothari opined that the "storyline [had] been stretched a good deal more than it should have" been. He found the editing weak but noted that Narayan showed "promise". On Khanna's acting, he commented that she exhibited "her limitations" which possibly could be ascribed to her role. He concluded his review by saying that the film "is entertaining enough to draw audiences". Screen magazine wrote it "tackles an unusual subject in an interesting and sensitive manner".

Khanna told in an interview that scriptwise it was her best film. Aditya Narayan was nominated for the Zee Cine Award for Best Actor in a Supporting Role – Male for his performance in the film.

References

External links 

1998 films
1990s Hindi-language films
Films scored by Jatin–Lalit
Films shot in Ooty
Films shot in London
Films shot in Tamil Nadu
Films set in Mumbai
Films directed by Deepak Sareen